The Castle of Marialva is a Portuguese castle in Mêda, Guarda. It has been listed as a National monument since 1978.

External links
Marialva Castle at IPPAR  

Marialva
Marialva
National monuments in Guarda District